North Qu'Appelle is a former provincial electoral division  for the Legislative Assembly of the province of Saskatchewan, Canada. The district was created before the 1st Saskatchewan general election in 1905, and abolished before the 8th Saskatchewan general election in 1934 into Melville and Touchwood. It is now part of Last Mountain-Touchwood and Regina Wascana Plains. It was the riding of Premier James Garfield Gardiner.

Members of the Legislative Assembly

Election results

|-

 
|Provincial Rights
|Henry Noble Rutledge
|align="right"|668
|align="right"|43.38%
|align="right"|–
|- bgcolor="white"
!align="left" colspan=3|Total
!align="right"|1,540
!align="right"|100.00%
!align="right"|

|-

|style="width: 130px"|Provincial Rights
|John Archibald McDonald
|align="right"|990
|align="right"|53.86%
|align="right"|+10.48

|- bgcolor="white"
!align="left" colspan=3|Total
!align="right"|1,838
!align="right"|100.00%
!align="right"|

|-

|style="width: 130px"|Conservative
|John Archibald McDonald
|align="right"|882
|align="right"|51.31%
|align="right"|-2.55

|- bgcolor="white"
!align="left" colspan=3|Total
!align="right"|1,719
!align="right"|100.00%
!align="right"|

|-

 
|Conservative
|William Ernest Read
|align="right"|891
|align="right"|43.21%
|align="right"|-8.10
|- bgcolor="white"
!align="left" colspan=3|Total
!align="right"|2,062
!align="right"|100.00%
!align="right"|

|-

 
|Conservative
|George Wilson Balfour
|align="right"|1,244
|align="right"|40.51%
|align="right"|-2.70
|- bgcolor="white"
!align="left" colspan=3|Total
!align="right"|3,071
!align="right"|100.00%
!align="right"|

|-

|- bgcolor="white"
!align="left" colspan=3|Total
!align="right"|Acclaimation
!align="right"|

|-

|- bgcolor="white"
!align="left" colspan=3|Total
!align="right"|Acclaimation
!align="right"|

|-

|- bgcolor="white"
!align="left" colspan=3|Total
!align="right"|3,904
!align="right"|100.00%
!align="right"|

|-

 
|Conservative
|Walter Weston
|align="right"|1,448
|align="right"|31.46%
|align="right"|+31.46

|- bgcolor="white"
!align="left" colspan=3|Total
!align="right"|4,603
!align="right"|100.00%
!align="right"|

See also
North Qu'Appelle – Northwest Territories territorial electoral district (1870–1905).

Electoral district (Canada)
List of Saskatchewan provincial electoral districts
List of Saskatchewan general elections
List of political parties in Saskatchewan

References
 Saskatchewan Archives Board – Saskatchewan Election Results By Electoral Division

Former provincial electoral districts of Saskatchewan